Clap, el lugar de tus sueños, is a Mexican telenovela produced by Roberto Gómez Fernández in association with Giselle González Salgado for Televisa in 2003. Is an adaptation of the Spanish series Un paso adelante produced in 2002–05.

Ana Layevska, Ari Borovoy, Lidia Ávila and Kika Edgar star as the protagonists, while Fernanda Castillo, Thaily Amezcua and Luciano Seri star as the antagonists.

Plot 
Having been a renowned actress in her youth, Ofelia withdrew from the scenarios after losing their only daughter, who denied their support when he wanted to follow in his footsteps. Now, repentant, Ofelia dedicated his effort and talent to promote and develop the artistic skills of young people who study at your school. But what Ofelia craves above all else is to find his grandson, who disappeared the day that her daughter died giving birth.

Cast 
Ana Layevska as Valentina
Ari Borovoy as Juan Pablo
Lidia Ávila as Montserrat
Kika Edgar as Helena
Luciano Seri as Tomás
Fernanda Castillo as Camila
Damian Mendiola as Fabricio
Mauricio Martinez as Emiliano
Thaily Amezcua as Deborah
Mariana Ávila as Florencia
Manuel 'Flaco' Ibáñez as Padre Constatino
Luz María Aguilar as Ofelia
Eugenio Bartilotti as Neto
Marlon Castro as Rolando
Wendy González as Jazmin
Mauricio Bueno as Eric
Luz María Jerez as Victoria
Karen Juantorena as Daniela
Macaria as Lucia
Yula Pozo as Juventina
Rosita Pelayo as Zulema
Luis Couturier as himself
Eduardo Liñan as Federico
Roxana Saucedo as Gracia
Luis Gatica as Rivadeniera
Mariana Karr as Alenka
Polo Ortin as Ezequiel
Raul Araiza Jr. as Gregorio
José Luis Reséndez as César
Martin Ricca as Martin
Marco Uriel as Valentina's father

References

External links

Mexican telenovelas
Televisa telenovelas
2003 Mexican television series debuts
2004 Mexican television series endings
2003 telenovelas
Spanish-language telenovelas